The Nil Ratan Sircar Medical College and Hospital (NRSMC&H), also known as NRS Medical College, Kolkata (formerly Campbell Medical College), is a public medical school and hospital in Kolkata, India. It is located in Sealdah, in the heart of Kolkata.

The institute was established on 1 December 1873 as Sealdah Medical School.

History 
In 1864, the British government was compelled to open a hospital due to the social and political pressures that arose from epidemics, class struggle, and the Sepoy Mutiny. Considering this urgent need, the decision was made to convert the Sealdah Market Building at Central Hall into what was to be known as the Sealdah Municipal Hospital.

On 1 December of 1873, the Sealdah Medical School was established and underwent several name changes. In 1884, it was renamed the Campbell Medical School and in 1894 became the Campbell Medical College. After gaining independence from British rule in 1950, the college was renamed for the last time to Nil Ratan Sircar Medical College in honor of freedom fighter and one of the college's famous alumnus, physician Sir Nilratan Sircar.

The institution is recognized under the Medical Council of India, New Delhi, and is run by the Government of West Bengal. It is affiliated with West Bengal University of Health Sciences and offers both undergraduate and postgraduate studies in various departments.

Contributions 
Throughout its history, many discoveries and treatments were fostered at Sealdah:

 In 1912, Dr. Kedarnath Das innovated the Bengal Forceps which maintains a similar size to the pelvic curve of Asian and Bengali women and the size of the head of a baby.
 In 1922, Dr. Upendranath Brahmachari discovered Urea Stibamine for the treatment of Kala-azar which was considered as a landmark in the field of antibiotics. 
Cholera Toxin was discovered by Dr. Sambhu Nath De in Nilratan Sircar Medical College and Hospital which was a milestone in the application of science in medical treatment.
Dr. Subhash Mukhopadhyay (physician) worked with the first "test-tube baby".
Dr. Pradip Mukherjee separated four sets of conjoined twins. The first one done in the year 1999.
The work on Natural Valve Replacement and Coronary Bypass by Dr. Saibal Gupta.
Elbow prosthesis by Dr. D.P. Bakshi.

Central Library 
The N.R.S. Medical College Library is situated on the entire third floor of the Academic Building. It occupies almost a 4,000 square meter area. The reading rooms and the seating capacity of the library have been increased per the guideline of the MCI for 250 undergraduate admissions annually. The reading area for students is separated into indoor and outdoor reading rooms, each with a 250 seating capacity. The reading areas for the faculty, PG, and PDT students (each with a seating capacity of 50) have been shifted to the southern side of the library. Most of the library is air-conditioned. The digital library has been revamped with the addition of new computers and other equipment. The N.R.S. Medical College Library is a part of the Institutional Member of British Council Library, Kolkata.

The Ministry of Human Resource Development (MHRD), of India, under its NMEICT mission, has entrusted IIT Kharagpur to host, coordinate, and set-up the National Digital Library (NDL) of India.

A workshop was organized on "Institutional Digital Repository and Medical Metadata Engineering" at AIIMS, New Delhi, on 20–21 October 2016. Professor Prantar Chakraborty, HOD, Department of Hematology, Mr. Mani Mohan Ghosh, librarian, and Mr. Sayak Mukherjee, IT Support Personnel have attended the workshop and acquired the training to frame a repository to create the National Knowledge Asset – the key driving force for education, research, innovation, and knowledge in the medical field.

Departments 

A. Pre-clinical
 Anatomy
 Physiology
 Biochemistry

B. Para-clinical
 Pathology
 Pharmacology
 Microbiology
 Forensic Medicine & Toxicology
 Community Medicine
 Physical Medicine & Rehabilitation

C. Clinical
 General Medicine
 General Surgery
 Obstetrics & Gynecology
 Pediatric Medicine
 Ophthalmology
 E.N.T (Otorhinolaryngology)
 Anesthesiology
 Dermatology
 Radiology
 Psychiatry
 Orthopedics & PMR

D. Subspecialty
 Cardiology
 Neurology
 Nephrology
 Endocrinology
 Cardio Thorasic Vascular Surgery (CTVS)
 Pediatric Surgery
 Neurosurgery
 Transfusion Medicine & Blood Bank
 Chest Medicine (Pulmonology)
 Oncology and Radiotherapy
 Plastic Surgery
 Urology

Notable alumni

 Sir Nilratan Sircar, namesake of the institute and also an Indian doctor, educationist, philanthropist and swadeshi entrepreneur.
Vece Paes, former Indian hockey midfielder, and representing the Indian team in the 1972 Munich Olympics, that won the bronze medal.
 Dr. Ram Chandra Dome an Indian politician and a leader of the Communist Party of India(Marxist) . A doctor by profession, he was a M.P. elected to the Lok Sabha from Birbhum in West Bengal state in 1989, 1991, 1996, 1998, 1999 and 2004. In 2009, he was elected to the Lok Sabha from Bolpur.
 Haimabati Sen (class of 1894), physician and memoirist
Uma Saren was the M.P. from Jhargram (2014-19). She was the 1st Santhali woman in the Parliament. She is from AITC party.
Anil Kumar Mandal, known for his research on glaucoma. Also an elected fellow of the National Academy of Medical Sciences.

Gallery

References

External links
 Official website

Hospitals in Kolkata
Medical colleges in India
Affiliates of West Bengal University of Health Sciences
Hospitals established in 1873
1873 establishments in British India